Fritz Heinrich Lewy (January 28, 1885 – October 5, 1950), known in his later years as Frederic Henry Lewey, was a German-born American neurologist. He is best known for the discovery of Lewy bodies, which are a characteristic indicator of Parkinson's disease and dementia with Lewy bodies.

Lewy was born to a Jewish family in Berlin, Germany, on January 28, 1885. He trained in Berlin and Zürich and graduated from Berlin in 1910. He worked in Alois Alzheimer's  Munich laboratory and was contemporary with Hans Gerhard Creutzfeldt (1885–1964), Alfons Maria Jakob (1884–1931) and  Ugo Cerletti (1877–1963). In 1933, he fled Nazi Germany and moved to the United States. Lewy died in Haverford, Pennsylvania, on October 5, 1950, aged 65.

References

External links
 
 

1885 births
1950 deaths
American neurologists
German neurologists
Jewish emigrants from Nazi Germany to the United States
Jewish scientists
Lewy body dementia
Scientists from Berlin